Godman or God-man may refer to:

 Godman (name)
 Godman (India), a colloquial term used in India for a charismatic spiritual leader
 The Godman, a 1999 Indian Malayalam film
 God-Man, a recurring character in the comic Tom the Dancing Bug
 Qodman, Azerbaijan - also spelled Godman
 GodMen, a men's ministry founded by Conservative Christian comedian Brad Stine
 God-man (Christianity) (lat. Deus homo), the concept of divine incarnation of Jesus Christ in Christian mysticism
 Hypostatic union, in Christian theology the union of Christ's humanity and divinity

See also
 Ike! Godman, a Japanese tokusatsu show from 1972